This is a list of the candidates running independently, or without affiliation, in the 41st Canadian federal election.

Alberta

British Columbia

Manitoba

New Brunswick

Newfoundland and Labrador

Ontario

Quebec

Saskatchewan

See also
Results of the Canadian federal election, 2011
Independent candidates, 2008 Canadian federal election

References

Candidates in the 2011 Canadian federal election